Allan Phillip Jaffe (April 24, 1935, Pottsville, Pennsylvania - March 9, 1987, New Orleans) was an American jazz tubist and the entrepreneur who, along with his wife Sandra, developed Preservation Hall into a New Orleans jazz tradition.

Jaffe's grandfather was Russian-Jewish as was his father-the grandfather played french horn in the Imperial Russian Army. His father was a mandolin player and teacher. Jaffe learned piano and cornet before settling on tuba in junior high school. He studied at the University of Pennsylvania before joining the Army. He was stationed to Fort Polk, Louisiana.

Following his discharge, Jaffe moved to New Orleans in 1961, where he took over management of Preservation Hall. As owner of the facility, he played a major role in the New Orleans jazz revival of the 1960s, shepherding the latter-day careers of George Lewis, Jim Robinson, Alcide Pavageau, Punch Miller, Chester Zardis, Kid Sheik Cola, Percy Humphrey, Willie Humphrey, Kid Thomas Valentine, Billie and De De Pierce, and others.

He also played the tuba in the Preservation Hall Jazz Band and took the group on tours worldwide, booking them into the finest music and performance halls and making appearances at cultural events of note even in small communities.

Jaffe's son, Ben Jaffe, is a double-bass and tuba player, who now leads and performs with the Preservation Hall Jazz Band.

References

Floyd Levin, "Allan Jaffe (i)". The New Grove Dictionary of Jazz.

1935 births
1987 deaths
American jazz tubists
Jewish jazz musicians
American male jazz musicians
Jazz musicians from Pennsylvania
20th-century American musicians
University of Pennsylvania alumni
United States Army soldiers
20th-century American male musicians
Preservation Hall Jazz Band members
Olympia Brass Band members